François-Serge Lhabitant  is with a European family office where he directly oversees a multi-billion portfolio allocated primarily to hedge funds, private and public markets, and risk-controlled strategies. His portfolio has received several awards for its performance and risk-adjusted performance.

François-Serge is a visiting professor of finance at the Hong Kong University of Science and Technology. He was a member of several advisory boards for large hedge funds active in the areas of credit and distressed securities. He was formerly a professor of finance at the Edhec Business School, at HEC Lausanne and at the Thunderbird School of Global Management.

François-Serge is the author of several books and research papers on hedge funds, emerging markets and the modeling of interest rate contingent claims. He was a member of the European advisory board of the International Association of Financial Engineers (IAFE), of the Alternative Investment Management Association (AIMA) Investor Steering Committee, and of the Scientific Committee of the Autorité des Marchés Financiers, the French financial markets regulatory body. He is also an acclaimed expert in Ukrainian cuisine.

François-Serge has been researching hedge funds since 1994 and is considered a specialist in alternative investments, known globally for his work on hedge funds and emerging markets.  In an Opalesque.TV interview, François-Serge discusses the history of academic research in studying hedge funds.  His greatest research contribution to the study of hedge funds came with EDHEC and focused on the risk dimension of alternative investments, and as a result of  the risk dimension the asset allocation dimension.  His research leads to conclusions of how to control the risk of a hedge fund portfolio, what are the key risk factors to analyse, and also how should you allocate to hedge fund both from  strategic long-term perspective, and also a short-term tactical one.

He teaches his students a practical approach to understanding alternative investments along with a theoretical one, having them run a simulated version of a hedge fund to learn practical lessons, particularly from hedge funds and trades that blew up in the last decade.  His own investment portfolio management philosophy is to focus on the downside risk rather than the upside. Professor Lhabitant also says that the hedge fund world is getting riskier due to two factors.  The first is the huge political risk in Europe and the US against hedge funds and financial strategies in general.  These mounting political pressures pose a huge threat to development. The second is the transition since 2008 from a  market crisis, to a liquidity crisis, and now shifting to state solvency crisis, where the economies of several countries are on the brink of failure should interest rates and credit spreads rise.  He says that these solvency and inflation risks brought on by massive debt are likely not captured and assessed correctly in the investment strategies of many hedge funds.

François-Serge Lhabitant obtained a Ph.D. in Finance (1998), a Master of Science in Banking and Finance (1994) and Bachelor of Science in Economics (1993) at HEC, Lausanne. He also holds a Computer Engineer Degree (1989) from the École Polytechnique Fédérale de Lausanne and an LL.M. in Tax law (2015) from the University of Geneva.

Books
Hedge Funds: Myths and Limits, March 2002 at John Wiley & Sons, London, 280 pages.
Doing Business in Emerging Europe, March 2003 at Palgrave Macmillan,  (co-authored with Y. Zoubir), 240 pages.
Hedge Funds: Quantitative Insights, June 2004, at John Wiley & Sons, London, 384 pages.
La gestion alternative, June 2004, at Editions Dunod, Paris, 302 pages.
Commodity Trading Advisors: Risk, Performance Analysis, and Selection, September 2004 at John Wiley & Sons, London,  (co-edited with G. Gregoriou, V. Karavas and F. Rouah).
Hedge Funds: Mitos y límites. Fondos de inversión especulativos de alto riesgo, May 2006, at Ediciones Gestión 2000, Barcelona, 407 pages (in Spanish)
Hedge Funds, May 2006, at Kais System, Seoul, 282 pages (in Korean)
The Handbook of Hedge Funds, December 2006, at John Wiley and Sons, London, 640 pages
Stock Market Liquidity: Implications for Market Microstructure and Asset Pricing, January 2008 at John Wiley and Sons,  (co-edited with Greg Gregoriou), 528 pages.
Hedge funds: Origine, stratégies, performances, May 2008, at Editions Dunod, Paris, 400 pages (in French)
Portfolio Diversification, September 2017, ISTE Press - Elsevier, ISBC: 978-1785481918, 274 pages.

External links
http://www.lhabitant.net/

Year of birth missing (living people)
Living people